Vasili is a small village in the Famagusta District of Cyprus, near the villages Leonarisso and Lythragomi. It is under the de facto control of Northern Cyprus.

Climate

References

Communities in Famagusta District
Populated places in İskele District
Greek Cypriot villages depopulated during the 1974 Turkish invasion of Cyprus